Conosphaeron is a genus of beetles in the family Cerambycidae, containing the following species:

 Conosphaeron concolor Linsley, 1935
 Conosphaeron spinipenne Chemsak & Linsley, 1967

References

Elaphidiini